Language recognition may refer to:
 Language identification
 Natural-language understanding
 Speech recognition